The Great Oahu crake or Great Oahu rail (Porzana ralphorum) is an extinct bird species that was endemic to the island of Oahu in Hawaii.  It was one of two flightless rails that had survived on the island until the arrival of people in 200 C.E.

It was the larger of two species of rail found on the island of Oahu. There were several specimens of this bird found in early settlements. The Great Oahu crake was probably a brown, grey, and black bird like its recently extinct relatives the Hawaiian and Laysan rails. It probably fed on the fruits, leaves, and flowers of trees that fell onto the ground.

The cause of extinction is not very well known, but we can speculate that it was hunted for meat, and that its bones and feathers were used for decoration. It may also have been attacked by the Polynesian rats that were introduced by early settlers.

External links
  Database entry includes justification for why this species is extinct

Extinct flightless birds
Extinct birds of Hawaii
Porzana
Holocene extinctions
Endemic fauna of Hawaii
Birds described in 1973